Louis Abolafia was an artist, social activist, and folk figure. His candidacy for president of the United States under the Nudist Party on the hippie Love Ticket at various times in the 1960s and onward was a form of political theater or performance art. He ran against Richard Nixon in 1968 as the naked hippie love candidate with the slogan: "What Have I Got to Hide?" Abolafia previously had run in 1967 under the Cosmic Love Party, also then with the slogan "What Have I Got to Hide?"

The son of a New York City florist, Abolafia was part of the Greenwich Village art scene in the 1960s. In this capacity, he organized love-ins and happenings that combined music, poetry and audience participation, inspiring the New York press to crown him "The Love King". He was a long-time resident of the Lower East Side, and he sheltered wayward youths and other transients in his storefront studio in the East Village. He published a pornographic and countercultural newspaper, Abolafia's Luv, and had several art exhibitions from 1967 to 1970. He befriended a number of notable 1960s artists, including musician Bob Dylan, artist Yayoi Kusama, Beat poet Allen Ginsberg, Andy Warhol (and Factory hangers-on), Canadian socialite Margaret Trudeau, and Satsvarūpa Dāsa Gosvāmī, a senior disciple of A.C. Bhaktivedanta Swami Prabhupada, the founder of the Hare Krishna movement.

Abolafia inspired the creation of the Exotic Erotic Ball in 1979 in San Francisco, held annually for more than three decades until it was canceled in 2010. In press materials for the first Ball, which was held as a campaign fundraiser for Abolafia, he was said to have coined the phrase "Make love, not war", though the attribution is disputed.

He was a "descendant of the Abolafias—writers of the Kabbala".

Death
Louis Abolafia died of a drug overdose in 1995 in California, aged 54.

References

External links
 Profile
 Obituary, alt.nntp2http.com 
 Abolafia for President, New Yorker.com

1941 births
1995 deaths
Activists from New York (state)
People from the Lower East Side
Candidates in the 1980 United States presidential election
20th-century American politicians
Social nudity advocates
Drug-related deaths in California
Candidates in the 1968 United States presidential election
American people of Sephardic-Jewish descent
Jewish American activists
20th-century American Jews
American naturists